Ludovino Darío Espínola Alegre, known as Darío Espínola,  is an Argentine football manager and former player who played as a right back. He is the current manager of Arsenal de Sarandí's reserve team.

He is nicknamed "Cafu" after the famous Brazilian rightback.

Career

Espínola started his playing career in 1992 with Argentino de Quilmes. In 1993, he joined Arsenal de Sarandí where he remained for 16 years, making him one of the club's longest serving players and the player with the 2nd most appearances in the history of the club with over 400 games in all competitions, behind Carlos Ruiz. The highlights of his career were the club's promotion to the Argentine Primera División in 2002 and the victory on the 2007 Copa Sudamericana.

In 2010 Espínola left Arsenal and joined second division side Defensa y Justicia.

Personal life
Espínola is the brother of Oscar Espínola and uncle of Aníbal Leguizamón.

Honours

References

External links
  Argentine Primera statistics at Futbol XXI
 Football-Lineups player profile

1973 births
Living people
People from Posadas, Misiones
Argentine footballers
Association football defenders
Argentine Primera División players
Arsenal de Sarandí footballers
Defensa y Justicia footballers
Argentine football managers
Argentine Primera División managers
Arsenal de Sarandí managers
Argentine sportspeople of Paraguayan descent
Sportspeople from Misiones Province